Helsinki Academic Male Choir KYL (in Finnish: Kauppakorkeakoulun Ylioppilaskunnan Laulajat or KYL), founded in 1949, is an academic male choir from Helsinki, Finland. The choir is associated closely with Aalto University School of Business, consisting mainly of students and alumni of the university.

The choir's artistic range spans classical Finnish (e.g. by Jean Sibelius, Leevi Madetoja, Toivo Kuula, Selim Palmgren, and Armas Järnefelt) and international male choir music, modern compositions (e.g. by Einojuhani Rautavaara and Jaakko Mäntyjärvi), barbershop, as well as pop music arrangements. KYL has participated in several international competitions and toured extensively abroad. The choir performs regularly in the Helsinki metropolitan area.

In 2018 Master of Music Visa Yrjölä became the artistic director of the choir. Previous artistic directors include Matti Apajalahti (1997–2017), Raul Talmar (1992–97), Heikki Saari (1975–92), Aapeli Vuoristo, Kaj Chydenius, Ensti Pohjola, Ahti Sonninen, and Jorma Tolonen.

Awards
 Winner (40 voices and under) & Champion Choir - The V Cornwall International Male Voice Choir Competition 2011
 Winner (international series) - The V International Leevi Madetoja Choir Competition 2010
 Finnish Male Choir of the Year 1998

Tours
 USA and Canada 2010
 Spain 2009
 China 2006
 Germany 2003
 Brazil 2002

Discography
 Larin-Kyösti - Elämän kertoja (2013, "Larin-Kyösti - Narrator of The Life")
 Kirje Korvatunturille (2008 "A Letter to Santa Claus")
 Hämärän ääniä (2008, "Sounds of Twilight")
 Kullervo (2005)
 Maailma jääkukkien takana (2001, "The World Behind Frost Flowers")
 Legenda (1999, "Legend")

See also
 Aalto University School of Business
 The Academic Female Choir KYN

External links
 Official Website
 Aalto University School of Business

References

Finnish choirs
Musical groups established in 1949
1949 establishments in Finland